Dirk Stoop (ca 1615–1686) was a widely travelled painter and engraver of the Dutch Golden Age. Alternative versions of his name include Dirck Stoff, Theodorus (van der) Stoop, Thierry (the French version) and Rod(e)rigo, by which he was known in Portugal.

Biography

Stoop was born in Utrecht. His father was the glass painter Willem Jansz. van Stoop and his brother Maerten was also a painter, especially of war scenes. According to Houbraken, his father had also been the first teacher of Abraham Diepraam. Houbraken considered the elder Stoop to be a good horse painter. The younger Stoop was a pupil in the Utrecht guild and was known for Italianate landscapes with hunting parties, views of ports, cavalry scenes, history paintings, still lifes and altar pieces, which were valued highly in his time. 

Some time in 1639 Stoop went to live in Italy and afterwards seems to have led an itinerant existence. While in Lisbon and became Court painter to the Princess Catherine of Braganza, whom he followed to London when she was betrothed to Charles II in 1662. From this time dates the series of eight large plates portraying her progress from Portsmouth to Hampton Court. He is also known to have executed twenty-four engravings for the second, luxury edition of John Ogilby’s Aesop’s Fables in 1665, signing them as R(ordrig)o Stoop.

After a four-year stay in London, Stoop returned to Utrecht, where he died in 1686.

References

External links
Dirk Stoop on Artnet

1610s births
1686 deaths
Artists from Utrecht
Dutch expatriates in Portugal
Dutch Golden Age painters
Dutch male painters
Painters at the Portuguese royal court